The Bangor Limestone is a fossil bearing Mississippian geologic formation in Alabama.

See also

 List of fossiliferous stratigraphic units in Alabama
 Paleontology in Alabama

References
 

Geologic formations of Alabama
Carboniferous southern paleotropical deposits